Bolívar is a town and municipality located in the Department of Valle del Cauca, Colombia.

Ricaurte, a village within the municipality of Bolívar, is home to the world's largest known cluster of people with fragile X syndrome. Around 5% of the village population carries the genetic mutation or premutation.

References

Municipalities of Valle del Cauca Department